Anal bleaching is the process of lightening the color of the skin around the anus. It is done for cosmetic purposes, to make the color of the anus more uniform with the surrounding area. Some treatments are applied in an office or salon by a cosmetic technician and others are sold as cream that can be applied at home.

History

Pornographic film actresses were the first to undergo the anal bleaching process, in an effort to lighten the color of their anuses to match the rest of their skin.   As Brazilian waxing became popular, due to the popularity of smaller swimsuits and lingerie, the spread of pornography into the mainstream, and endorsement of the procedure by celebrities, women began noticing that their anuses were darker than the rest of their skin.  The increase in the number of women engaging in anal sex has also contributed to women's concern over the appearance of their anus.  To combat this perceived problem, anal bleaching began to gain appeal.  Some gay men also make use of this procedure.

The procedure was briefly shown in 2004 in an episode of Cosmetic Surgery Live.  One salon that performed the procedure received an increase in queries in 2005 attributed to an episode of Dr. 90210 on E!, when porn star Tabitha Stevens was filmed having her anus bleached.  It was mentioned in Brüno (2009) and Bridesmaids (2011), Impractical Jokers (2021) and in women-focused magazines such as Marie Claire.

The treatment was  first offered in the US in California in 2005; it was reported to be available at the same time in Australia.  Spas outside of Hollywood were slow to begin offering it as a beauty treatment, with just one New York spa offering the service by 2007.  Creams are now sold for use at home.  Although the popularity of anal bleaching has not approached that of Brazilian waxing, it  received mainstream recognition in the US in the  2010s.

Methods
There are several methods to carry out the anal lightening process. The most common method is to simply use an at-home lotion or gel to target the darkened anal and genital area and gradually fade the darkened area over time.

Chemicals 
Many early cosmetics designed for anal bleaching contained ingredients that would irritate the sensitive anal area, creating temporary discomfort and even burning, scarring, or incontinence. However, modern products are more likely to be designed with sensitive skin in mind, and are aimed at producing lightening effects without irritation.

Hydroquinone 
The process performed with creams containing hydroquinone is banned in some countries, such as the member states of the EU.  In 2006, the FDA removed previous advice that stated hydroquinone was considered generally safe, as hydroquinone has been linked to ochronosis, where skin becomes permanently discoloured and disfigured, and because it may also be a carcinogen.  All over-the-counter (OTC) sales over hydroquinone were banned in the US with the CARES Act of 2020 and a prescription is now required for purchase.

Acids 
Other principal ingredients that are used in skin lightening cosmetics are arbutin and kojic acid.  Arbutin, often also called bearberry, can be converted by the body into hydroquinone.

Kojic acid was developed as a safer alternative to hydroquinone, however it is less effective at lightening and also carcinogenic.

Azelaic acid is another option.

Mercury 
Mercury was commonly used as a skin lightening agent. However, due to the known hazards of mercury (renal damage, neurotoxicity, anxiety and depression), the FDA has prohibited mercury in cosmetic products since 1974, except for trace amount below 1 ppm (21CFR'700.13).

See also
 Labiaplasty
 Vajazzle

References

Cosmetics
Body modification process
Body modification
Bleaching